Fort Orange may refer to:

Fort Orange (New Netherland), now Albany, New York
Fort Orange (Bonaire) on the island of Bonaire
Fort Orange (Dutch Brazil)
Fort Orange (Ghana)
Fort Orange (Gorée) on the island of Gorée off the coast of Senegal
Fort Orange (Sint Eustatius) in Oranjestad, Sint Eustatius
Fort Orange (Taiwan), now Tainan

Fort Oranje (Ternate),  the administrative center of the Dutch East India Company before its transfer to Batavia